Peter Almásy (born 11 February 1961) is a French ice hockey player. He competed in the men's tournaments at the 1988 Winter Olympics and the 1992 Winter Olympics.

References

External links

1961 births
Baltimore Skipjacks (ACHL) players
Czechoslovak emigrants to France
Czechoslovak ice hockey players
French people of Slovak descent
Ice hockey players at the 1988 Winter Olympics
Ice hockey players at the 1992 Winter Olympics
Les Aigles de Nice players
Living people
Olympic ice hockey players of France
Rapaces de Gap players
Sportspeople from Poprad
Springfield Indians players
St. Catharines Saints players